Canara HSBC Life Insurance is a Life insurance company in India. Established in 2008, Canara HSBC Life Insurance  was a joint venture between Canara Bank (51%), HSBC Insurance (Asia Pacific) Holdings Limited (26%) and Punjab National Bank (23%).  On 15 June 2022, the company renamed itself as Canara HSBC Life Insurance after the exit of its third partner, Punjab National Bank.

Headquartered in Gurugram, the company has branch offices PAN India. The company sells and services its customers through partner bank branches.

The company offers various products across individual and group space consisting of life, health, online term plans, credit life and employee benefit segments.

History and overview  
The company was set up in 2008. In February 2014, Canara HSBC Life Insurance  introduced the concept of online revival of the policy, enabling customers to reinstate a lapsed policy and allows to pay their premium online.

It has also partnered with 3 rural regional banks, Pragathi Gramin Bank in Karnataka and Shreyas Gramin Bank in Uttar Pradesh in 2009 and South Malabar Gramin Bank in 2010. The company was partnered with Dhanlaxmi Bank in June 2017. It is also tied up with Can Fin Homes and IndianMoneyInsurance.com. In April 2020, Oriental Bank of Commerce had merged with Punjab National Bank. On 15 June 2022, the company rebranded as Canara HSBC Life Insurance.

Financials 
The company registered a profit of ₹105 crore (US$19 million) for the financial year ended in March 2020, And  for the financial year ended in March 2019.

In 2022, the company registered a profit of 32% on new business weighted premium income of  compared to its last financial year with .

Key people 

 L. V. Prabhakar as Chairman
 Anuj Mathur as Managing Director & CEO
Tarun Rustagi as Chief Finance Officer
 Kiran Yadav as Chief People Officer
Tarannum Hasib as Chief Distribution Officer
Rishi Mathur as Chief Digital & Strategy Officer
Deven Sangoi as Chief Investment Officer (CIO)
Sachin Dutta as Chief Operating Officer (COO)
Vikas Gupta as Chief Compliance Officer
Akshay Dhand as Appointed Actuary

Products 

 Guaranteed Income4Life is a non-linked, non-par individual life insurance savings-cum-protection plan

Advertising and marketing campaigns 
On 1 March 2021, the firm released a series of short films as digital campaign, depicting different life stages and their respective life insurance goals. It is a brand awareness campaign of a product "iSelect Star Term Plan" with a theme of "Raho Life Ke Har Twist Ke Liye Tayyar".

See also 

 Canara Bank
 HSBC Insurance (Asia Pacific)
 List of insurance companies in India
 Oriental Bank of Commerce
 Punjab National Bank

References 

Life insurance companies of India
Financial services companies established in 2008
Indian companies established in 2007
2007 establishments in Haryana
Companies based in Gurgaon